Kyaw Htay is a Burmese politician who currently serves as an Pyithu Hluttaw MP for Leshi Township. He is a member of the National League for Democracy.

Early life and education
Won Hla was born on 2 December 1977 in Leshi Township, Myanmar. He is an ethnic Naga.

Political career
He is a member of the National League for Democracy. In the 2015 Myanmar general election, he was elected as an Pyithu Hluttaw member of parliament and as a representative from Leshi Township

References

National League for Democracy politicians
1977 births
Living people
People from Sagaing Region
Naga people